The 2019–20 First League of the Republika Srpska was the twenty-fifth season of the First League of the Republika Srpska, the second tier football league of Bosnia and Herzegovina, since its original establishment and the eighteenth as a second tier league. The season began on 10 August 2019 and ended abruptly on 8 May 2020 due to the COVID-19 pandemic in Bosnia and Herzegovina, with Krupa getting promoted to the Premier League of Bosnia and Herzegovina and no one getting relegated.

Earlier in the season, Sloga Gornje Crnjelovo withdrew from the league after only two rounds.

Teams
FK Jedinstvo Brčko
FK Kozara Gradiška
FK Krupa
FK Modriča
FK Podrinje Janja
FK Rudar Prijedor
FK Slavija Sarajevo
OFK Sloga Gornje Crnjelovo
FK Tekstilac Derventa
FK Željezničar Banja Luka

League table

See also
2019–20 Premier League of Bosnia and Herzegovina
2019–20 First League of the Federation of Bosnia and Herzegovina
2019–20 Bosnia and Herzegovina Football Cup

References

External links
Official site for the Football Federation of Bosnia and Herzegovina
Official site for the Football Federation of the Republika of Srpska

 

Bos
2
First League of the Republika Srpska seasons
Bosnia and Herzegovina